H. N. Ashequr Rahman (এইচ, এন আশিকুর রহমান) is a Bangladesh Awami League politician and the incumbent Member of Parliament from Rangpur-5.

Early life 
Rahman was born on 11 December 1941. He has a B.A. and a M. A. degree. HN Ashikur Rahman was the Additional DC of Tangail in 1971.

Career 
Rahman is elected Treasurer of Central Committee of Bangladesh Awami League. He is the Chairman of Meghna Bank Limited and Member of Board of Trustees, East West university.

Personal life 
Ashikur Rahman's wife Rehana Haque. His father-in-law Mohammad Abdul Haq is a former minister, former MP and former IGP of police. His son Rasheq Rahman is the assistant secretary of the Awami League sub-committee.

References 

Awami League politicians
Living people
1941 births
10th Jatiya Sangsad members
11th Jatiya Sangsad members
7th Jatiya Sangsad members
9th Jatiya Sangsad members
3rd Jatiya Sangsad members